Grièges is a commune in the Ain department in eastern France.

Geography
The Veyle forms most of the commune's northern border, then flows into the Saône, which forms the commune's western border.

Population

See also
 Communes of the Ain department

References

Communes of Ain
Ain communes articles needing translation from French Wikipedia
Bresse